Newport Railway may refer to:

In Australia
Newport–Sunshine railway line: a railway line in the western suburbs of Melbourne, Australia.

In the United Kingdom

In England

Mainland 
Newport, Abergavenny and Hereford Railway: a railway line connecting the Welsh port of Newport to the English town of Hereford.
Newport Pagnell Railway: a branch line in Buckinghamshire, United Kingdom running from Wolverton to Newport Pagnell.

Isle of Wight 
Cowes & Newport Railway Company: a predecessor to the Isle of Wight Central Railway.
Freshwater, Yarmouth and Newport Railway: a railway that followed a route westwards out of Newport, Isle of Wight.
Isle of Wight (Newport Junction) Railway: a line between Sandown and Newport.
Newport, Godshill & St Lawrence Railway: a  branch of the Isle of Wight Central Railway.
Ryde & Newport Railway: a predecessor to the Isle of Wight Central Railway.

In Scotland
Newport Railway, Scotland: a line along the south bank of the estuary of the River Tay in the east coast of Scotland.

In Wales
Newport, Abergavenny and Hereford Railway: a railway line connecting the Welsh port of Newport to the English town of Hereford.
Pontypool, Caerleon and Newport Railway: a line between its namesake towns in Monmouthshire, South Wales.
Pontypridd, Caerphilly and Newport Railway: a line connecting the collieries of the Aberdare and Rhondda valleys with Newport.
Newport and Pontypool Railway: a railway between the eastern South Wales Valleys and the River Usk at Newport.

In the United States
Herkimer, Newport and Poland Railway: a component of the New York Central Railroad.
Old Colony & Newport Railway: part of a railroad system in southeastern Massachusetts and parts of Rhode Island.
Old Colony and Newport Scenic Railway: a heritage railroad in Rhode Island.
Santa Ana and Newport Railway: a short line that ran through present-day Costa Mesa and Newport Beach, California.